Albin Lee Meldau (born February 8, 1988) is a Swedish singer, songwriter and musician. He self-released his debut EP, Lovers, in 2016 with help from producer Björn Yttling (of Peter Bjorn and John).

Later that year, Albin signed to Astralwerks, who re-released his Lovers EP, and in 2017 released the follow-up Bloodshot EP.

In 2017, Albin was named by NPR Music as one of their must-see artists at that year's SXSW, and featured as part of their Tiny Desk Concert series. NPR Music described his voice as "breathtaking, soulful, thunderous and impossible to ignore".

He was previously part of a band called the Magnolia.

His debut album, About You, was released on 1 June 2018. In 2018, he appeared on Så mycket bättre, which is broadcast on TV4. On 8 May 2020, Meldau released the first EP out of two, called På svenska (Sida A).

Discography

Studio albums

Extended plays

Singles 

Notes

References 

Living people
Swedish male singers
Swedish soul singers
Musicians from Gothenburg
Swedish pop singers
Neo soul singers
Astralwerks artists
1988 births